Sandra Auffarth (born 27 December 1986) is a German equestrian.

At the 2012 Summer Olympics she competed in the Individual eventing with Opgun Louvo. Auffarth and Louvo had won team gold and individual bronze at the 2012 Summer Olympics. One year before, she had won team gold and individual silver with Opgun Louvo at her first senior rider championship - the 2011 European Eventing Championship.

She lives in Ganderkesee, where she and her parents have a horse farm.

CCI 5* Results

International Championship Results

Notable Horses 

 Carlos 205 - 1997 Dark Bay Oldenburg Gelding (Coriolan x Matcho AA)
 2006 European Young Rider Championships - Team Bronze Medal, Individual 21st Place
 Nobel Prince OLD - 1999 Bay Oldenburg Gelding (Noble Roi XX x Ramiro's Son I)
 2007 European Young Rider Championships - Team Bronze Medal
 Opgun Louvo - 2002 Chestnut Selle Francais Gelding (Shogoun II x J't'adore)
 2009 FEI Eventing Young Horse World Championships - Bronze Medal
 2011 European Championships - Team Gold Medal, Individual Silver Medal
 2012 London Olympics - Team Gold Medal, Individual Bronze Medal
 2014 World Equestrian Games - Team Gold Medal, Individual Gold Medal
 2015 European Championships - Team Gold Medal, Individual Silver Medal
 2016 Rio Olympics - Team Silver Medal, Individual 11th Place

References

German female equestrians
1986 births
Living people
Olympic equestrians of Germany
Equestrians at the 2012 Summer Olympics
Equestrians at the 2016 Summer Olympics
Olympic gold medalists for Germany
Olympic silver medalists for Germany
Olympic bronze medalists for Germany
People from Delmenhorst
Sportspeople from Lower Saxony
Olympic medalists in equestrian
Medalists at the 2012 Summer Olympics
Medalists at the 2016 Summer Olympics
Equestrians at the 2020 Summer Olympics